Raavi Kondala Rao (11 February 1932 – 28 July 2020) was an Indian actor, screenwriter, playwright, and journalist who worked in Telugu cinema and Telugu theatre. He acted in over 400 films. He won Nandi Award for Best Story Writer for Pelli Pusthakam (1991) and won Nandi Award for Best Book on Telugu Cinema for Black and White.

He made his film debut with Sobha in 1958 as an actor. Preminchi Choodu (1964) won him recognition as an actor. He is known for his collaborations with Bapu-Ramana. He worked as a writer for notable films like Brundavanam (1992), Bhairava Dweepam (1994), Sri Krishnarjuna Vijayam (1996).

Besides films, he worked as an editor, writer and columnist for English and Telugu newspapers and magazines. He worked as the associate editor for the then popular film magazine Vijaya Chitra from 1966 to 1990. Later, he joined Chandamama Vijaya production house as a writer and executive producer.

Early life 
Raavi Kondala Rao was born on 11 February 1932 in Srikakulam of present-day Andhra Pradesh. His father was a postmaster. His education had been done in Srikakulam. He participated in Satyagraha in 1948 in Rajahmundry against the ban on RSS and Hindu Mahasammelan and was put in jail for three months. In his free time in Rajahmundry Jail, he read many books on literature. He wrote stories under the pen name of 'Mana Oohalu'. A few stories had been published in Chandamama.

Career 
Raavi Kondala Rao used to write articles for Mahodaya weekly newspaper. He worked as sub editor for Aanandavani weekly magazine. He was a writer of 'Paata Bangaram' in Sitara magazine, owned by the Eenadu group. He used to write cinema articles for Andhra Jyothi, Vijaya Chitra.

Kodavatiganti Kutumba Rao was his inspiration for writing. Later, he was encouraged by Mullapudi Venkata Ramana, Gutha Ramineedu to act in films. He also worked as an assistant director for B. N. Reddy, Kamalakara Kameswara Rao, D. V. Narasa Raju. He was the assistant director for Nartanasala (1963), directed by Kamalakara Kameswara Rao. He also worked as an assistant director for Pooja Phalam (1964), directed by B. N. Reddy.

Personal life 
Veteran actress Radha Kumari was his wife. She was his co-star in nearly 100 films. His brother R. Kameswara rao was a leading dubbing artist.

Raavi Kondala Rao died of heart attack at a private hospital in Hyderabad, aged 88, on 28 July 2020. He is survived by his son, R. V. Sasikumar.

Partial filmography

A
Adrusta Jathakudu (1971)
Andala Ramudu (1973)
Aadapille Nayam

B
Brahmachari (1968)
Bhale Rangadu (1969)
Badi Panthulu (1972) as Kanthayya
Brundavanam (1993)
Bhairava Dweepam (1994) as Story Writer

C
Chantabbai (1986)

D
Daiva Balam as assistant director
Donga Kollu (1988)

J
Jeevitha Chakram (1971)

K
Karna as assistant director for D. V. Narasa Raju

M
Moguda Pellama (1975)
Madam (1994)

N
Nartanasala as Assistant Director

P
Pooja Phalam as assistant director
Preminchi Choodu (1965)
Pelli Pustakam (1991) as Story writer

R
Ramudu Bheemudu (1998)
Rangoon Rowdy (1979)
Ramudu Bheemudu (1988)

S
Shakuntala as assistant director

T
Thene Manasulu (1965)

V
Veera Pandya Katta Brahmanna as assistant for D. V. Narasa Raju

Movies as actor

A
Aadapille Nayam
Ammayi Pelli
Attalu Kodallu
Amaayakuraalu
Ali Baba 40 Dongalu(1970)
Adrusta Jathakudu (1971)
Aggimeedha Guggilam (1968)
Ardha Ratri

B
Bangaru Sankellu
Bhale Rangadu
Brahmachari
Brundavanam

C
Chalaki Mogudu Chadastapu Pellam
Chantabbai

D
Dasara Bullodu
Dagudu Moothalu
Daagudu Moothala Daampatyam 
Dongalaku Donga as Hanumantha Rao

E
Edurinti Mogudu Pakkinti Pellam
Erra Gulabeelu

G
Gandikota Rahasyam

I
Idekkadi Nyayam

K
Kodalu Diddina Kapuram
King
Kalam Maarindhi as guest appearance
Kutumba Gauravam

M
Madam
Mee Sreyobhilashi
Manishiko Charitra

N
Neeti-Nijayiti
Nijam Chepite Nerama (1983)
Nirdoshi

O
Oy!

P
Prema Khaidi
Preminchi Choodu
Pelli Pustakam

R
Ramayanamlo Pidakala Veta
Radha Gopalam

S
Savasagallu
Sirimalle Navvindi
Sipayi Chinnayya
Sri Krishnarjuna Vijayam

V
Varakatnam
Veerabhimanyu
Varudu (2010)

Others
365 Days (2015)

References

External links 
 
 TV Interview
 Naagavali Nunchi Manjeera Varaku
 Ravi Kondala Rao interview

Male actors in Telugu cinema
Indian male film actors
1932 births
Telugu screenwriters
2020 deaths
20th-century Indian male actors
21st-century Indian male actors
Male actors from Andhra Pradesh
People from East Godavari district
Indian writers' organisations
Writers from Andhra Pradesh